The Factoring Regulation Act of 2011 is an Act of the Parliament of India to regulate factoring.

References 

2011 in India
Acts of the Parliament of India 2012
Credit